Michèle Taïna Audette (born July 20, 1971) is a Canadian politician and activist. She has served as president of Femmes autochtones du Québec (Quebec Native Women) from 1998 to 2004 and from 2010 to 2012. She was also the president of Native Women's Association of Canada from 2012 to 2014. From 2004 through 2008, she served as Associate Deputy Minister at the Ministry of Relations with Citizens and Immigration of the Quebec government, where she was in charge of the Secretariat for Women. 

In 2017, she was appointed as one of the five commissioners of the government's national inquiry into missing and murdered Indigenous women and girls. In 2021, Prime Minister Justin Trudeau nominated her to the Canadian Senate, as a Senator for Quebec.

Life 
In 1971, Audette's mother was returning to Schefferville from Sept-Îles by train when she unexpectedly went into labour. The train stopped and her mother was airlifted by helicopter to the nearest hospital, in Wabush, Labrador, where Audette was born. She grew up in Schefferville, Maliotenam, and Montreal. Audette is from the Innu community of Uashat mak Mani-Utenam in Quebec. Her mother, Evelyne St-Onge, is Innu and her father, Gilles Audette, is French-Canadian from Montreal. The family was denied a house on her mother's reserve under federal law because her mother married a non-Native man. St-Onge co-founded the Quebec Native Women Association in 1974, which fought against the clause in the federal Indian Act that stated that a Native woman who marries a non-Native man did not have the right to live in her reserve community. Native men who marry non-Native women do not suffer such restrictions.

As Audette grew up, she too became an activist in indigenous affairs. She served as president of Femmes autochtones du Québec (FAQ) from 1998 to 2004, and from 2010 to 2012, then led the Native Women's Association of Canada (NWAC) from 2012 to 2014, the youngest women to be elected. She also acted in one of the short film vignettes on Canadian history known as Heritage Minutes as a member of an Attikamek family teaching early French settlers how to make maple syrup.

Audette was appointed as Associate Deputy Minister at the Ministry of Relations with Citizens and Immigration Quebec government, in charge of the Secretariat for Women, serving from 2004 through 2008. She has conducted public relations for and acted as coordinator of many festivals. She has also worked as a researcher for Aboriginal Nations, a news magazine broadcast on Télé-Québec.

In 2017, Audette was appointed as one of five commissioners to the national inquiry: Missing and murdered Indigenous women and girls to raise awareness and gain government action on the issue of missing and murdered Indigenous women in Canada. The inquiry, which had an estimated cost of $53.8 million, examined the factors and institutions that contribute to a high rate of violence against Indigenous women and girls. Their final report, delivered to the federal government in 2019, included 231 calls for justice.

In May 2021 she appeared on Ici Radio-Canada's literary debate show Le Combat des livres, advocating for Michel Jean's novel Kukum. The novel won the competition.

Politics
Some years after her first government service, Audette decided to enter electoral politics. In the 2015 Canadian federal election, she ran as the Liberal candidate for the Quebec riding of Terrebonne and was defeated to Bloc Québécois candidate Michel Boudrias.

In July 2021, she was appointed a senator for Quebec. Initially non-affiliated, she joined the Independent Senators Group on September 27, 2021. On June 27, 2022, she joined the Progressive Senate Group.

Personal life
Audette, a mother of five, lives in both Wendake near Quebec City and the Innu reserve of Maliotenam near Sept-Îles, Quebec, with her domestic partner Serge Ashini Goupil. He is a consultant with the indigenous rights group Nation Innue.

Awards 

 Woman of Distinction Award in the Inspiration category from the Women’s Y Foundation of Montréal (2018)
 Woman of the Year in by the Montreal Council of Women (2014)
 Queen Elizabeth II Diamond Jubilee Medal (2012)

Electoral record

References

External links

See also 

 Missing and murdered Indigenous women

1971 births
Living people
21st-century First Nations people
Canadian Métis people
Canadian women's rights activists
Candidates in the 2015 Canadian federal election
Concordia University alumni
First Nations activists
Franco-Newfoundlander people
French Quebecers
Innu people
Liberal Party of Canada candidates for the Canadian House of Commons
People from Côte-Nord
Quebec candidates for Member of Parliament
Canadian senators from Quebec
Independent Canadian senators
Women members of the Senate of Canada
First Nations women in politics
Missing and Murdered Indigenous Women and Girls movement